The Hoher List is a stratovolcano, near the town of Daun in the Eifel region. The hill is in the county of Vulkaneifel in the German state of Rhineland-Palatinate.

Location 
The Hoher List lies in the Volcanic Eifel, part of the Eifel Mountains, in the Volcanic Eifel Nature Park. It is located about 4.5 km as the crow flies south of the town of Daun, immediately southwest of Schalkenmehren by the Schalkenmehrener Maar.

Description 
On the summit of this sparsely wooded domed hill stands the Hoher List Observatory and, on its densely forested southwestern spur at an elevation of 540.1 m is the castle of Altburg.

The L 64 state road, a section of the Eifel-Ardennes Road, runs past the summit of the Hoher List, linking Schalkenmehren to the north with Brockscheid to the south.

References 

Mountains under 1000 metres
Mountains and hills of Rhineland-Palatinate
Mountains and hills of the Eifel
Volcanoes of Germany